The Cozla Fossil Site is located near the town of Piatra Neamț in Romania. The limestones exposed at this site are part of the Cozla Formation.

Geography of Neamț County